The United States maintains numerous embassies and consulates around the world, many of which are in war-torn countries or other dangerous areas.

Diplomatic Security
The Regional Security Office is staffed by Special Agents of the Diplomatic Security Service (DSS), and is responsible for all security, protection, and law enforcement operations in the embassy or consulate.  The Regional Security Officer (RSO) is the senior DSS Special Agent in country and is the principal adviser to the Chief of Mission (generally an Ambassador or Consul General) on all security, law-enforcement, and counter-terrorism issues for that country or region.  The RSO is responsible for liaising with the host government's security and law enforcement officials.  The RSO is supported by a Marine Security Guard (MSG) Detachment, Assistant Regional Security Officers (ARSOs) and local security guards.

Attacks on US diplomatic facilities

See also

 American diplomatic missions
 United States Department of State
 List of attacks on diplomatic missions
 Moscow Signal, suspected attack by microwave.

References

Sources
 US Department of State – Political Violence Against Americans, 1987–2002 and 2008
 

Terrorism in the United States
United States Department of State
List